Dure Limite is the fourth studio album by French rock band Téléphone, released in 1982 on Virgin Records. The French edition of Rolling Stone magazine named this album the 3rd greatest French rock album (out of 100). Ivan Kral, of the Patti Smith Group, co-wrote the song "Ce soir est ce soir", though his name is spelt Yvan Kral on some CD booklets.

Track listing
All tracks written by Jean-Louis Aubert, unless otherwise noted.

"Dure Limite" – 4:38
"Ça (C'est Vraiment Toi)" – 4:28
"Jour Contre Jour" – 3:37
"Ex-Robin des Bois" – 3:26
"Le Chat" (Aubert, Marienneau) – 4:55
"Serrez" – 3:58
"Le Temps" (Aubert, Bertignac) – 4:18
"Cendrillon" (Aubert, Bertignac) – 3:58
"Juste un Autre Genre" (Aubert, Bertignac) – 3:43
"Ce Soir Est Ce Soir" (Aubert, Ivan Kral) – 6:24

The album was number one of french charts for 7 weeks.

Members

Jean-Louis Aubert – rhythm guitar, lead vocals
Louis Bertignac – lead guitar, backing vocals, lead vocals in "Cendrillon"
Richard Kolinka – drums
Corine Marienneau – bass, backing vocals, lead vocals in "Le Chat"

References

Téléphone albums
1982 albums
Albums produced by Bob Ezrin
Virgin Records albums